The 2006 NACAC Combined Events Championships were held in San Juan, Puerto Rico, at the Estadio Sixto Escobar on August 25–26, 2006. 
A detailed report on the event and an appraisal of the results was given.

Complete results were published.

Medallists

Results

Men's Decathlon
Key

Women's Heptathlon
Key

Participation
An unofficial count yields the participation of 15 athletes from 6 countries.

 (4)
 (2)
 (1)
 (1)
 (1)
 (6)

See also
 2006 in athletics (track and field)

References

Pan American Combined Events Cup
NACAC Combined Events Championships
International athletics competitions hosted by Puerto Rico
NACAC Combined Events Championships